Legally Blind is a 2017 Philippine television drama series broadcast by GMA Network. Directed by Ricky Davao, it stars Janine Gutierrez. It premiered on February 20, 2017 on the network's Afternoon Prime line up replacing Hahamakin ang Lahat. The series concluded on June 30, 2017 with a total of 93 episodes. It was replaced by Impostora in its timeslot.

The series is streaming online on YouTube.

Premise
Grace is about to fulfill her dream of being a lawyer. On the day to celebrate the results of her bar exam results, she will be raped leading to her pregnancy and an accident that will lead to her blindness.

Cast and characters 

Lead cast
 Janine Gutierrez as Grace Reyes Evangelista-Villareal

Supporting cast
 Mikael Daez as Edward Villareal
 Lauren Young as Charina "Charie" Reyes Evangelista
 Marc Abaya as William Villareal
 Rodjun Cruz as Joel Apostol
 Chanda Romero as Marissa Reyes-Evangelista
 Therese Malvar as Nina Reyes Evangelista
 Lucho Ayala as John Castillo
 Ashley Rivera as Diana Perez
 Camille Torres as Elizabeth Guevarra Anton Villareal

Guest cast
 Ricky Davao as Manuel Evangelista
 Denise Barbacena as Sabrina
 Max Collins as Darlene Santos-Aguirre
 Thea Tolentino as Maricar Nuevo
 Paolo Gumabao as Chanston Aguirre
 Rolly Innocencio as a lawyer
 Dexter Doria as Martha
 Dex Quindoza as Morgan Campos
 Rob Sy as Marcus
 Rafael Siguion-Reyna as Henry
 Madeleine Nicolas as Stella Villareal
 Menggie Cobarrubias as Anton Villareal
 Elijah Alejo as Young Grace 
 Dayara Shane as Young Charie

Ratings
According to AGB Nielsen Philippines' Nationwide Urban Television Audience Measurement ratings, the pilot episode of Legally Blind earned a 12% rating. While the final episode scored a 6.2% rating in Nationwide Urban Television Audience Measurement People in television homes.

Accolades

References

External links
 
 

2017 Philippine television series debuts
2017 Philippine television series endings
Filipino-language television shows
GMA Network drama series
Television shows set in the Philippines